Stuart Highway is a major Australian highway. Its northern and southern extremities are segments of Australia's Highway 1. The principal north–south route through the central interior of mainland Australia, the highway is often referred to simply as "The Track".

The highway is named after Scottish explorer John McDouall Stuart, who was the first European to cross Australia from south to north. The highway approximates the route Stuart took.

Route description

Overview

The Royal Flying Doctor Service uses the highway as an emergency landing strip and sections of the highway are signed to that effect. These sections of highway have been specially selected and prepared for the landing of aircraft which only takes place after the piece of road has been closed by the police.

There are petrol and other facilities (meals, toilets, etc.) available at reasonable intervals (usually around ) and more frequent rest stops. Some of the rest stops are located at scenic points with information boards, but others are little more than a picnic table and a rubbish bin in an otherwise deserted area.

Northern Territory

The Northern Territory section of the Stuart Highway starts from the edge of the Darwin central business district at Daly Street and continues as a dual-carriageway to the Arnhem Highway in Howard Springs.

At Daly Waters, the route number changes from A1 to A87. It passes through the Macdonnell Ranges and finally crosses the Northern Territory/South Australia border south of Kulgera.

The highway was only fully sealed in February 1987 as part of the Australian Bicentenary roadworks programme. There are no police patrolling the majority of this remote highway and until the end of 2006 there was no speed limit outside towns and other built-up areas on the Northern Territory part. The bulk of the Northern Territory's population not living in Darwin lies along its track.

South Australia

Stuart Highway passes through the Far North region to Port Augusta. The highway passes through the Woomera Prohibited Area where travellers may not leave the road. The highway continues south-east towards Adelaide.

History

Background
John McDouall Stuart led the first successful expedition to traverse the Australian mainland from south to north and return, through the centre of the continent, in 1861–1862. In 1871–72 the Australian Overland Telegraph Line was constructed along Stuart's route. The principal road from Port Augusta to Darwin was also established on a similar route.

A track developed along the route of the telegraph, and by 1888 the road between Adelaide and Alice Springs was well known. Several wells along the route provided water, although these could run dry or be contaminated by dead animals, resulting in sections as long as  without water.

The route was traversed by motor vehicles in the 1920s. While passable, sections of the road could be sandy, boggy, washed away in the winter, or rugged with boulders. Several creek crossings were required, though few were difficult.

Highway planning and construction
With the onset of World War II, supply roads leading to the north of the country were considered vital by the Federal Government.
A central north–south highway was planned to connect the railheads at Alice Springs and Birdum,
with surveying completed in August 1940. The task of constructing the highway was split between the Main Roads Departments of three states, to ensure completion before the next wet season.

The Alice Springs–Birdum road was completed by December 1940, – upgraded from an often impassable track to an all-weather sealed highway that could cope with heavy military traffic. The  highway was built in under than 90 days. In one week,  was constructed, which was claimed to be a world record. The new highway, in conjunction with the railways at either end, reduced the impact of Darwin's isolation. Quick and efficient movement of military equipment and troop was possible, with the road remaining open throughout the wet season.

By March 1941, military authorities advocated extending the Alice Springs–Birdum road to Darwin. During the wet season, the road north of Birdum was impassable, which meant that a single railway line was the only connection through to Darwin. Construction was underway by October 1941, once again at a fast pace in an attempt to finish before the next wet season. The road was nearing completion in July 1942, although some sections were yet to be bitumenised.

Speed limits
There was no absolute speed limit in the Northern Territory before 1 January 2007 but maximum speed limits are now posted throughout the Stuart Highway. Previously, drivers were simply required to drive at a safe speed to suit the conditions. Thus, the Northern Territory section of the Stuart Highway had no speed limits at all. The Northern Territory traffic laws were updated from 1 January 2007 to be similar to the rest of Australia. This included placing a speed limit on all roads ( on major highways such as the Stuart Highway) and significantly increasing penalties for speeding.

The South Australian section is signposted as  outside built-up regions, between Port Augusta and the Northern Territory border.

In October 2013 the NT Government announced a trial period of reverting to an open speed limit on the  stretch between Alice Springs and Barrow Creek, beginning 1 February 2014. In September 2015, following the conclusion of the trial, a  stretch of the highway had its speed limits derestricted.

In March 2021, the road was closed due to a serious accident 500 km north of Adelaide at Wirraminna where the road collapsed due to burning diesel fuel that melted the road's plastic culverts. Plastic culverts had been used in place of concrete as they were seen as the best material for this particular location as the flood plain of the river is acidic and can destroy concrete culverts.

The road was closed while repair works took place. The asphalt also had to be given time to cure and the section of road underwent testing with a road train. With this now complete, both lanes are reopened with speed restrictions in place. Traffic signage is now in place and road users are asked to take extra care while travelling through this section of road.

Junctions

Motor racing

Motor races have been proposed or undertaken on the highway since the 1950s.

In 1994 the first and only Cannonball Run in Australia ran from Darwin to Yulara and back again. Based on similar events in the United States, this event ended in tragedy when an out of control Ferrari F40 crashed into a checkpoint south of Alice Springs, resulting in the death of the two event officials manning the checkpoint as well as the two competitors. The remainder of the race had a  speed limit imposed to prevent further accidents.

Stuart Highway is the highway taken in the World Solar Challenge. The  race starts in Darwin, follows Stuart Highway to Port Augusta, and then Highway 1 through to Adelaide.

Engineering heritage award 
Stuart Highway North received a Historic Engineering Marker from Engineers Australia as part of its Engineering Heritage Recognition Program.

See also

 Highways in Australia
 List of highways in the Northern Territory
 List of highways in South Australia

References

Citations

Bibliography

 Exploring the Stuart Highway: further than the eye can see. West Beach, South Australia: Tourist Information Distributors Australia, 1997. ISSN 1326-6039

Further reading

External links

 Driving Guide by Roderick Eime
 Explorers Way Drive from Adelaide to Darwin

Highways in Australia
Roads in Darwin, Northern Territory
Highways in the Northern Territory
Highways in South Australia
Transport in Alice Springs
Highway 1 (Australia)
Far North (South Australia)
Recipients of Engineers Australia engineering heritage markers